Johan Niklasson (born 17 January 1985) is a Swedish footballer who plays for Oskarshamns AIK as a defender.

References

External links
 

1985 births
Living people
Association football defenders
Swedish footballers
Allsvenskan players
Superettan players
Kalmar FF players
Åtvidabergs FF players
Jönköpings Södra IF players
IFK Värnamo players
Oskarshamns AIK players